Paulo Rodriguez may refer to:

 Paulo Rodriguez, contestant on the 2004 Manhunt television gameshow
 Paulo Rodriguez, footballer with the Chilean club Club de Deportes Cobreloa

See also
Paul Rodriguez (disambiguation)
Paulo Rodrigues (disambiguation)